Yunlin Station, is a metro station of Line 2, Wuxi Metro. It started operations on 28 December 2014. The station is near Wuxi IKEA Store, B&Q, Decathlon.
The station is often congested due to this proximity.

Station layout

Exits
There are 4 exits for this station.

Gallery

References

External links

Railway stations in Jiangsu
Wuxi Metro stations
Railway stations in China opened in 2014